Murray Waxman (July 10, 1925 – November 27, 2022) was a Canadian basketball player who competed in the 1948 Summer Olympics and the 1950 Maccabiah Games. Born in Toronto, Ontario, he played for YMHA Montreal and was part of the Canadian basketball team which finished eighth in the Olympic tournament. 

Waxman later won a silver medal representing Canada at the 1950 Maccabiah Games in Tel Aviv.

Waxman died on November 27, 2022, at the age of 97.

References

1925 births
2022 deaths
Basketball players from Toronto
Basketball players at the 1948 Summer Olympics
Canadian men's basketball players
Olympic basketball players of Canada